Lee Kang-bok (born 17 November 2000) is a South Korean freestyle skier. He competed in the 2018 Winter Olympics.

References

2000 births
Living people
Freestyle skiers at the 2018 Winter Olympics
South Korean male freestyle skiers
Olympic freestyle skiers of South Korea
Freestyle skiers at the 2016 Winter Youth Olympics